Atrox is a Norwegian avant-garde metal band from Trondheim. The group originally formed under the name "Suffocation" but soon changed it because of numerous other bands with the same name. Formed in 1988, the band released its first material only in 1997, and followed it with two releases on notable French metal label, Season of Mist. While their early releases are firmly rooted in death metal, later releases incorporate more progressive elements.

Members

Current
-viNd- - guitars
Rune Sørgård - guitars, programming
Tor Arne Helgesen - drums
Erik Paulsen - bass
Rune Folgerø - lead vocals
Per Spjøtvold - keyboard, backing vocals

Former
Ole Marius Larmerud - guitars (2002–2005)
Monika Edvardsen - vocals, keyboard (1996–2004)
Pete Beck - vocals, bass (2002–2004)
Daniel Stavsøyen - bass (2001–2002)
Tom Wahl - bass (1999)
Dag Rune Øyan - guitars (1995–1999)
Lars Halvard Søndrol - drums (1994–1999)
Tommy Sebastian Halseth - bass (1995–1999)
Geir Tore Johansen - vocals (1988–1997)
Svenn Tore Mauseth  bass (1988–1995)
Tor-Helge Skei - guitars (1988–1994)
Tomas Smagersjø - drums (1993)
Geir Knarrbakk - drums (1988–1992)
Gunder Audun Dragsten - guitars (1988–1990)

Discography
1997 Mesmerised (Head Not Found Records)
2000 Contentum (Season of Mist)
2002 Terrestrials (Season of Mist)
2003 Orgasm (Code 666)
2008 Binocular (Season of Mist)
2017 Monocle

References

External links
Official website
Interview with Tor Arne Helgesen - English @ Metalfan.ro

Norwegian death metal musical groups
Norwegian avant-garde metal musical groups
Norwegian progressive metal musical groups
Norwegian gothic metal musical groups
Musical groups established in 1988
1988 establishments in Norway
Musical groups from Trondheim
Season of Mist artists